Rozhniativ Raion was a raion (district) of Ivano-Frankivsk Oblast (region). The urban-type settlement of Rozhniativ was the administrative center of the raion. The raion was abolished on 18 July 2020 as part of the administrative reform of Ukraine, which reduced the number of raions of Ivano-Frankivsk Oblast to six. Rozhniativ Raion, Dolyna Raion and Kalush Raion were amalgamated. The area of Rozhniativ Raion was merged into Kalush Raion.

Subdivisions
At the time of disestablishment, the raion consisted of five hromadas:
 Broshniv-Osada settlement hromada with the administration in the urban-type settlement of Broshniv-Osada;
 Duba rural hromada with the administration in the selo of Duba;
 Perehinske settlement hromada with the administration in the urban-type settlement of Perehinske;
 Rozhniativ settlement hromada with the administration in Rozhniativ;
 Spas rural hromada with the administration in the selo of Spas.

Settlements
The region did not have cities, however there were three urban-type settlements.
Broshniv-Osada
Perehinske
Rozhniativ

References

External links
 Website of the District Administration

Former raions of Ivano-Frankivsk Oblast
1965 establishments in Ukraine
Ukrainian raions abolished during the 2020 administrative reform